The Unholy Three is a 1930 American Pre-Code melodrama directed by Jack Conway and starring Lon Chaney. Its plot involves a crime spree. The film is a sound remake of the silent 1925 film of the same name, with both films based on the novel The Unholy Three, by Tod Robbins.

In both versions, the roles of Professor Echo and Tweedledee are played by Lon Chaney and Harry Earles respectively.  This film is notable for the fact that it was Chaney's last film, as well as his only talkie. Chaney died from throat cancer one month after the film's release.

Plot
A sideshow is closed by the police after Tweedledee (Harry Earles), the embittered "Twenty Inch Man", kicks a young boy, starting a riot. Echo, the ventriloquist, proposes that Tweedledee, the strongman Hercules (Ivan Linow), and he leave and, as "The Unholy Three", use their talents to commit crimes. Echo also takes along his pickpocket girlfriend Rosie (Lila Lee) and his gorilla, whom Hercules fears.

Echo disguises himself as Mrs. O'Grady, a kindly old grandmother who runs a pet shop. Tweedledee pretends to be her baby grandson, and Hercules her son-in-law. They use the information they gain from their wealthier patrons to rob them. Echo is the leader and brains behind the outfit, but his bossy ways leave the other two resentful. Meanwhile, the shop's clerk, Hector McDonald (Elliott Nugent), falls in love with Rosie.

The gang is ready to pull off a theft on Christmas Eve. When Echo decides to postpone it, Tweedledee and Hercules go ahead without him. Afterwards, Tweedledee gleefully recounts how they not only robbed but also killed the wealthy Mr. Arlington, despite his pleas for mercy. Worried about the police, they decide to frame Hector by planting a stolen necklace in his closet.

That same night, Hector asks Rosie to marry him. Ashamed of her past, she pretends she was only leading him on for a laugh. After he leaves, she starts crying; he returns, sees that she really does love him, and they become engaged.

However, Hector is arrested for murder. Still frightened, the Unholy Trio hide out in an isolated cabin in the country, forcibly taking Rosie with them. Rosie pleads with Echo to exonerate Hector somehow in exchange for her returning to him. Tweedledee tries to persuade Hercules to shoot them both, but the strongman refuses.

Echo, as "Grandma" O'Grady, shows up at the trial and tries to provide an alibi, but slips up and his disguise is discovered. He makes a full confession and receives a sentence of one to five years. Back at the cabin, Tweedledee overhears Hercules offering Rosie a chance to run away with him (and the loot), so he lets loose the gorilla; Hercules murders Tweedledee before he himself is killed by the ape. Rosie escapes.

As Echo is being taken to prison, Rosie promises to wait for him, honoring their agreement. Realizing she loves Hector, he generously tells her not to.

Cast
 Lon Chaney as Professor Echo / Mrs O'Grady
 Lila Lee as Rosie O'Grady
 Elliott Nugent as Hector McDonald
 Harry Earles as Midget / Tweedle Dee
 John Miljan as Prosecuting Attorney
 Ivan Linow as Hercules
 Clarence Burton as Detective Regan
 Crauford Kent as Defense Attorney
 Sidney Bracey as Mr. Arlington's butler 
 Trixie Friganza as Lady Customer (uncredited)
 Joseph W. Girard as Judge (uncredited)
 Armand Kaliz as Jeweler (uncredited)

Reception

Film critic Leonard Maltin awarded the film two and a half out of four stars, praising Chaney's performance while criticizing the performances by the rest of the cast.

References

External links 

 
 
 
 

1930 films
1930 crime drama films
1930s Christmas drama films
American crime drama films
American black-and-white films
Remakes of American films
Cross-dressing in American films
Films based on American novels
Films directed by Jack Conway
Films produced by Irving Thalberg
Sound film remakes of silent films
Metro-Goldwyn-Mayer films
Melodrama films
American Christmas drama films
1930s American films